Will Rogers State Historic Park is the former estate of American humorist Will Rogers. It lies in the Santa Monica Mountains in Los Angeles, in the Pacific Palisades area.

Geography
In what is now the Los Angeles neighborhood of Pacific Palisades, Rogers built his ranch, where he lived with his wife Betty and their three children, Will Jr., Mary and James. The 31-room ranch house, which includes 11 baths and seven fireplaces, is surrounded by a stable, corrals, riding ring, roping arena, golf course, polo field—and riding and hiking trails that give visitors views of the ranch and the surrounding countryside—186 acres (757,000 m2). The ranch became a State Park in 1944 after the death of Mrs. Rogers, and the house was listed on the National Register of Historic Places in 1971.

California State Parks completed a major renovation of the ranch house in 2002–2006. The project included reconstruction of flagstone areas that surround the house, seismic safety work, replacement of electrical systems and installation of a new heating and air conditioning system. The house reopened to the public in March 2006.

Beyond the ranch and the stables are the trails that lead to views of the countryside around the park. Since Will Rogers State Historic Park is on the tip of the Santa Monica Mountains, the trails have vistas of both the sea and the mountains. Visitors can hike to Inspiration Point, take the Rogers trail around the perimeter of the park or continue on into Topanga State Park via the Backbone Trail System.

History
Beyond the Rogers' home, the ranch reflects Will Rogers' roots in horsemanship, starting with the polo field, which is the first thing the visitor sees when looking south from the parking area. The field is the only outdoor polo field in Los Angeles County, and the only field that is regulation size. The ranch has been in many movies and television shows, including Star Trek IV, in which it stood in for Golden Gate Park. The polo field features a gentle slope that forms an area for viewing the polo action. Up from the parking area are the ranch buildings, including the visitor center, which once was the Rogers' garage and ranch guest house. The visitor center features a film on the life of Will Rogers, photo mural displays, literature and an audio tour of the grounds.

The ranch buildings and grounds are maintained as they were when the Rogers family lived there in the late 1920s and 1930s. The living room of the main ranch house includes a collection of Native American rugs and baskets, and several original Western art works by Charles M. Russell and Ed Borein. It also features a porch swing in the center of the room and a mounted calf, which was given to Will Rogers to encourage him to rope the calf instead of his friends. The north wing of the house, also furnished in period, original family furnishings, contains the family bedrooms, Rogers' study, and the family parlor/sunroom.

Proposed  closure
Will Rogers State Historic Park was one of the 48 California state parks proposed for closure in January 2008 by California's Governor Arnold Schwarzenegger as part of a deficit reduction program.

Gallery

See also
 Backbone Trail System
 Santa Monica Mountains topics index
 Will Rogers State Beach

References

External links

 Official website

Biographical museums in California
California State Historic Parks
Historic house museums in California
History of Los Angeles County, California
Houses in Los Angeles
Houses on the National Register of Historic Places in California
Literary museums in the United States
Museums in Los Angeles
National Register of Historic Places in Los Angeles
Open-air museums in California
Pacific Palisades, Los Angeles
Parks in Los Angeles
Regional parks in California
Santa Monica Mountains National Recreation Area
Santa Monica Mountains
Sunset Boulevard (Los Angeles)